Brasero may refer to:

Brasero (heater), a heater or an oven
Brasero (software), CD/DVD-burning software for Linux

See also
Bracero program